The Allen Paradice Memorial Trophy is awarded annually by the Western Hockey League to its top on-ice official as voted by the league's coaches and general managers.

Allen Paradice was a referee for many years in the WHL, as well as the league's Director of Officiating in the 1980s.  This award was created in 1994 and named in his honour.  Many of the officials who have won this award have moved on to officiate in the National Hockey League

Winners

References

External links
Official list of winners

Western Hockey League trophies and awards